Athletics was contested from October 7 to October 14 at the 2002 Asian Games in Busan Asiad Main Stadium, Busan, South Korea. A total of 459 athletes from 39 nations took part in the competition. Afghanistan, Bhutan, Brunei, Laos and Maldives were the only nations without a representative in the events.

Schedule

Medalists

Men

Women

Medal table

Participating nations
A total of 459 athletes from 39 nations competed in athletics at the 2002 Asian Games:

References 

2002 Asian Games Official Report, Pages 112–172

External links
Results - GBR Athletics

 
2002 Asian Games events
2002
Asian Games
2002 Asian Games